To Me... To You... is a British children's game show created for the BBC, which ran for three series between 21 June 1996 to 25 December 1998. The programme was presented by comedians Barry and Paul Elliott  in their roles as the Chuckle Brothers  and focused on two pairs of young children competing for prizes and taking part in various mini-games during the course of an episode. In addition to the presenters, the programme also included a series of celebrities, many involved in children's television during that period.

Format
As a children's game show, the programme is set on a fictional tropical island known as Chuckle Island, owned by the Chuckle Brothers. In each episode, two teams of two children compete against each other to win as many prizes offered by the programme. After playing a game to decide who begins first, each team takes it in turns to roll a dice and move a trolley carrying a set of prizes on it across a large board of 17 spaces consisting of a start space where the teams begin, a home space for each team, and a series of special spaces. The goal of the game is for a team to move the trolley onto their respective home space to claim the prizes on it  including those earned from correctly answering questions on prize spaces  whereupon the trolley is reset to the start with a new set of prizes. On each team's turn, one contestant rolls a dice, which determines how many spaces the trolley is moved and whether is towards or away from their home space  if a team lands on a double space, their opponents' roll is doubled.

At times, the teams undertake special games via a randomizer system that becomes active for the team in control either when they land on a "?" space or at specific points in the episode. In these games, the team playing the game must complete a challenge to win a coconut  which they can also earn from prize spaces  with some games featuring a special celebrity guest that have been involved in children's television at the time of broadcast  these have included Richard McCourt (better known as "Dick" of Dick and Dom),  Mark Speight, Dave Benson-Phillips, Paul Zerdin, Michaela Strachan, Elmo and Mr. Blobby. The game ends after a ferry horn sounds, at which points the teams earn the prizes they won, with the team having the most coconuts at the end earning a special prize from that episode's celebrity guest.

Transmissions

Series

Christmas Specials

External links

1990s British children's television series
1996 British television series debuts
1998 British television series endings
BBC children's television shows
BBC television game shows
British children's game shows
1990s British game shows
English-language television shows
Television series about children